Otto H. Luehrs (April 10, 1851 – August 30, 1934) was an American farmer and politician.

Born in Altona, Germany, Luehrs and his parents emigrated to the United States in 1857 and settled in Plymouth, Wisconsin. In 1867, Luehrs and his family moved to a farm in the town of Charlestown, Calumet County, Wisconsin. Luehrs served on the Charlestown Town Board and on the school board, serving as the clerk of the school board. In 1917, Luehrs served in the Wisconsin State Assembly and was a Republican. In 1917, Luehrs and his wife moved to New Holstein, Wisconsin. He later served as justice of the peace for New Holstein. Luehrs died of a stroke in New Holstein, Wisconsin.

Notes

External links

1851 births
1934 deaths
German emigrants to the United States
People from New Holstein, Wisconsin
Farmers from Wisconsin
School board members in Wisconsin
Wisconsin city council members
Republican Party members of the Wisconsin State Assembly
20th-century American politicians
People from Plymouth, Wisconsin
People from Charlestown, Wisconsin